Amandine Cuasnet (born 24 May 1991) is a French ice hockey player for Corsaires de Dunkerque and the French national team.

She represented France at the 2019 IIHF Women's World Championship.

References

External links

1991 births
Living people
French women's ice hockey forwards
Sportspeople from Dunkirk
Montreal Carabins women's ice hockey players